Living with the Enemy is a documentary series aired on SBS Australia throughout September and October 2014.

Plot

Episodes

Episode 1 : Same-Sex Marriage

Episode 2 : Detention Centres

Episode 3 : Immigration

Episode 4 : Islam

Episode 5 : Marijuana
 
Episode 6 : Hunting

Notes
In episode 4, "Counter-Jihadist" Ben lived with devout Muslim couple Lydia and Ahmed, and was supposed to host them in his home. But he stormed out only three days into the 10-day experiment, saying that "moderate Muslims" do not exist.

DVD release
The DVD will be released on 8 October 2014.

References

External links
 http://www.sbs.com.au/programs/living-with-the-enemy

Special Broadcasting Service original programming
2010s Australian documentary television series
2014 Australian television series debuts
2014 Australian television series endings
Racism in Australia